The Catholic Church in Bolivia is part of the worldwide Catholic Church, under the spiritual leadership of the Pope in Rome. Catholicism was introduced in the 1530s and the first diocese was established in 1552. Evangelization among the Indians bore much fruit from the mid-18th to early 19th century, resuming again in 1840. The country declared independence from Spain in 1825.

Today, Bolivia is a predominantly Catholic country. Although the Church was disestablished as the state religion in early 2009, relations between Church and state are guided by a concordat signed with the Holy See in 1951. According to a 2018 survey, 70% of Bolivians were Catholics.

Organization
There are seventeen territorial jurisdictions in the country—four archdioceses, six dioceses, and five apostolic vicariates and two Territorial Prelatures:

Archdiocese of Cochabamba
Diocese of Oruro
Territorial Prelature of Aiquile
Archdiocese of La Paz
Diocese of Coroico
Diocese of El Alto
Territorial Prelature of Corocoro
Archdiocese of Santa Cruz de la Sierra
Diocese of San Ignacio de Velasco
Archdiocese of Sucre
Diocese of Potosí
Diocese of Tarija
Apostolic Vicariates:
 Camiri
 El Beni
 Ñuflo de Chávez
 Pando
 Reyes

See also
Catholic Church by country
Religion in Bolivia

References 

 
Bolivia